The following television stations broadcast on digital channel 42 in the United States:

 K42DZ-D in Battle Mountain, Nevada, to move to channel 34
 K42FE-D in Shreveport, Louisiana, to move to channel 27
 K42IH-D in East Wenatchee, Washington, to move to channel 28
 K42IM-D in Minot, North Dakota, to move to channel 35
 K42IQ-D in Flagstaff, Arizona, to move to channel 21, on virtual channel 42
 K42JQ-D in Redding, California, to move to channel 27
 KMSX-LD in Sacramento, California, to move to channel 33, on virtual channel 51
 W42CK in Hagerstown, Maryland, to move to channel 25, on virtual channel 42

The following stations, which are no longer licensed, formerly broadcast on digital channel 42:
 K42CF-D in Gruver, Texas
 K42CH-D in Capulin, etc., New Mexico
 K42CR-D in Tucumcari, New Mexico
 K42EV-D in Glenwood Springs, Colorado
 K42GN-D in Preston, Idaho
 K42JB-D in Wyola, Montana
 K42KR-D in Mountain View, Wyoming
 K42LH-D in Winston, Oregon
 KIDZ-LD in Abilene, Texas
 KSEX-CD in San Diego, California
 W42AX-D in Bakersville, North Carolina
 W42DF-D in Cashiers, North Carolina
 W42DZ-D in Adjuntas, Puerto Rico
 WMOE-LD in Mobile, Alabama
 WMSY-TV in Marion, Virginia

References

42 digital